Spaghetti alla puttanesca (in Italian) is an Italian pasta dish invented in Naples in the mid-20th century and made typically with tomatoes, olive oil, olives, anchovies, chili peppers, capers, and garlic—with vermicelli or spaghetti pasta.

Origin
Various recipes in Italian cookbooks dating back to the 19th century describe pasta sauces very similar to a modern puttanesca under different names. One of the earliest dates from 1844, when Ippolito Cavalcanti, in his Cucina teorico-pratica, included a recipe from popular Neapolitan cuisine, calling it Vermicelli all'oglio con olive capperi ed alici salse. After some sporadic appearances in other Neapolitan cookbooks, in 1931 the Touring Club Italiano's Guida gastronomica d'Italia lists it among the gastronomic specialties of Campania, calling it "Maccheroni alla marinara", although the proposed recipe is close to that of a modern puttanesca sauce. In Naples, this type of pasta sauce commonly goes under the name aulive e chiapparielle (olives and capers).

The dish under its current name first appears in gastronomic literature in the 1960s. The earliest known mention of pasta alla puttanesca is in Raffaele La Capria’s Ferito a Morte (Mortal Wound), a 1961 Italian novel which mentions "spaghetti alla puttanesca come li fanno a Siracusa (spaghetti alla puttanesca as they make it in Syracuse)". The sauce became popular in the 1960s, according to the Professional Union of Italian Pasta Makers.

Nonetheless, the 1971 edition of the Cucchiaio d’argento (The Silver Spoon), one of Italy's most prominent cookbooks, has no recipe with the name puttanesca, but two recipes that are similar: The Neapolitan spaghetti alla partenopea, is made with anchovies and generous quantities of oregano; while spaghetti alla siciliana is distinguished by the addition of green peppers. Still again there is a Sicilian style popular around Palermo that includes olives, anchovies and raisins.

In a 2005 article from Il Golfo—a daily newspaper serving the Italian islands of Ischia and Procida—Annarita Cuomo asserted that sugo alla puttanesca was invented in the 1950s by Sandro Petti, co-owner of Rancio Fellone, a famous Ischian restaurant and nightspot. According to Cuomo, Petti's moment of inspiration came when—near closing one evening—Petti found a group of customers sitting at one of his tables. He was low on ingredients and told them he did not have enough to make them a meal. They complained that it was late and they were hungry, saying "Facci una puttanata qualsiasi," meaning something like  "make for us whatever the fuck you got!" Petti had nothing more than four tomatoes, two olives and some capers—the basic ingredients for the sugo, "So I used them to make the sauce for the spaghetti," Petti told Cuomo. Later, Petti included this dish on his menu as spaghetti alla puttanesca.

Etymology
Because puttana means roughly "whore" or "prostitute" and puttanesca is an adjective derived from that word, the dish may have been invented in one of many bordellos in the Naples working-class neighbourhood of Quartieri Spagnoli as a quick meal taken between servicing clients. Alternatively, food historian Jeremy Parzen suggests: "Italians use puttana (and related words) almost the way we use shit, as an all-purpose profanity, so pasta alla puttanesca might have originated with someone saying, essentially, 'I just threw a bunch of shit from the cupboard into a pan'."

Basic recipe
The sauce alone is called sugo alla puttanesca in Italian. Recipes may differ according to preferences; for instance, the Neapolitan version is prepared without anchovies, unlike the version popular in Lazio. Spices are sometimes added. In most cases, however, the sugo is a little salty (from the capers, olives, and anchovies) and quite fragrant (from the garlic). Traditionally, the sauce is served with spaghetti, although it is also paired with penne, bucatini, linguine, and vermicelli.

Garlic and anchovies (omitted in the Neapolitan version) are sautéed in olive oil. Chopped chili peppers, olives, capers, diced tomatoes, and oregano are added along with salt and black pepper to taste. The cook then reduces this mixture by simmering and pours it over spaghetti cooked al dente. The final touch is a topping of parsley.

See also 

 Spaghetti dishes
 Pasta dishes

Explanatory notes

References

 

Neapolitan cuisine
Spaghetti dishes
Anchovy dishes
Olive dishes